Carlos Robles may refer to:

 Carlos Robles Piquer (1925–2018), Spanish diplomat and politician
 Carlos Robles (Colombian footballer) (born 1992), Colombian football midfielder
 Carlos Robles (footballer, born 2000) (born 2000), Mexican football defender
 Charlie Robles (1943–2011), Puerto Rican singer and actor